Atavar is a 2000 AD comic strip, created by Dan Abnett and Richard Elson about the last human alive caught in a war between alien species.

Bibliography
Originally appearing in 2000 AD it has been reprinted by Rebellion Developments as a graphic novel which collects together the first two installments:

Installments
Atavar (in 2000 AD #1281-1288, 2002)
Atavar II (in 2000 AD #1329-1335, 2003)
Atavar III (in 2000 AD #1443-1449, 2005)

Graphic novel
Atavar (Dan Abnett and Richard Elson, Rebellion, 2004 )

External links
2000 AD page

2002 in comics
Comics by Dan Abnett
2000 AD comic strips